Balance and Composure was an American alternative rock band from Doylestown, Pennsylvania. They formed in the winter of 2007, after the breakup of two local Doylestown bands.

The band's music was often suggested having similarities to Title Fight, Brand New, and Nirvana. They released three studio albums and two EPs over the course of their career. Their second album The Things We Think We're Missing reached number 51 on the Billboard 200, number 10 on the Independent Albums, number 13 on the Modern Rock/Alternative Albums and number 16 on the Rock Albums charts.

On December 14, 2017, on Taylor Madison's Strange Nerve podcast, vocalist Jon Simmons announced that their upcoming anniversary tour would be their last. On January 14, 2019 a press release went out on the band's Twitter account announcing a farewell tour. Six dates were confirmed, saying that "These shows are the only shows we have planned in our future, we would love if you joined us one last time." The band later added extra dates due to high demand.

Discography
Studio albums
 Separation (2011)
 The Things We Think We're Missing (2013)
 Light We Made (2016)

EPs
 I Just Want to Be Pure (2008)
 Only Boundaries (2009)
 Balance and Composure/Tigers Jaw split (2010)
 Acoustic 7" (2012)
 Braid & Balance and Composure split (2012)
 Off the Board: A Studio 4 Family Compilation (2013)
 Postcard/Revelation 7" (2016)
 "Slow Heart" 7" (2017)

Music videos
 "Quake" (2012)
 "Reflection" (2013)
 "Tiny Raindrop" (2013)
 "Postcard" (2016)
 "Afterparty" (2016)

Members
Jon Simmons – lead vocals, rhythm guitar (2007–2019)
Andy Slaymaker – rhythm guitar, backing vocals  (2007–2019)
Matt Warner – bass  (2007–2017, 2019)
Erik Petersen – lead guitar (2010–2017, 2019)
Daniel Kerrigan – lead guitar, bass (2007–2008)

References

External links
 

Alternative rock groups from Pennsylvania
Musical groups from Philadelphia
Musical groups established in 2007
Musical groups disestablished in 2018
Vagrant Records artists
No Sleep Records artists
UNFD artists
Emo revival groups
American emo musical groups